Syssphinx is a genus of moths of the family Saturniidae. The genus was erected by Jacob Hübner in 1819.

Species
Syssphinx albolineata (Grote & Robinson, 1866) (Texas, Mexico)
Syssphinx amena (Travassos, 1941) (Ecuador)
Syssphinx bicolor (Harris, 1841) (northern and eastern United States, Mexico)
Syssphinx bidens (W. Rothschild, 1907) (Ecuador)
Syssphinx bisecta (Lintner, 1879) (northern and eastern United States)
Syssphinx blanchardi (Ferguson, 1971) (Texas)
Syssphinx chocoensis (Lemaire, 1988)
Syssphinx colla (Dyar, 1907) (Mexico)
Syssphinx colloida (Dyar, 1925) (Mexico)
Syssphinx digueti (Bouvier, 1929) (Mexico)
Syssphinx erubescens (Boisduval, 1872)
Syssphinx gadouae (Lemaire, 1971)
Syssphinx gomezi (Lemaire, 1984) (Mexico)
Syssphinx heiligbrodti (Harvey, 1877) (Texas, Mexico)
Syssphinx hubbardi (Dyar, 1903) (Texas, New Mexico, Arizona, California)
Syssphinx jasonoides (Lemaire, 1971)
Syssphinx malinalcoensis (Lemaire, 1975) (Mexico)
Syssphinx mexicana (Boisduval, 1872) (Mexico)
Syssphinx modena (Dyar, 1913) (Mexico)
Syssphinx molina (Cramer, 1780) (Mexico, Guatemala, Suriname)
Syssphinx montana (Packard, 1905) (Arizona, Mexico)
Syssphinx ocellata (W. Rothschild, 1907)
Syssphinx pescadori (Lemaire, 1988) (Mexico)
Syssphinx quadrilineata (Grote & Robinson, 1867) (Mexico to Panama, Venezuela, Guatemala, Ecuador)
Syssphinx raspa (Boisduval, 1872) (Arizona, Mexico)
Syssphinx smithi (Druce, 1904)
Syssphinx thiaucourti (Lemaire, 1975)
Syssphinx xanthina (Lemaire, 1984) (Guatemala)
Syssphinx yucatana (Druce, 1904) (Mexico)

References

Ceratocampinae